Caerleon railway station is a former station serving Caerleon on the east side of the city of Newport, UK and a proposed future station as part of the South Wales Metro.

History

The station was opened by the Pontypool, Caerleon and Newport Railway on 21 December 1874. This came after the absorption of the Pontypool company by the Great Western Railway. The station closed to passengers on 30 April 1962 and to all traffic on 29 November 1965.

The site is now mixed use business premises including a gym, MOT centre and Veterinary Clinic.

Proposed reopening 

The Newport City Council unitary development plan and Sewta rail strategy in 2006 set out plans for the station to be re-opened. Assessments by Capita Symonds in 2010 evaluated the cost of the project as £14.1m, and highlighted it would be of particular importance given the popular restaurant and pub environment in the town, as well as the 70,000 yearly visitors to the Roman tourist attractions nearby. Caerleon is particularly suited to public transport improvements as it has long had poor air quality. It has been subject to a Newport City Council air quality management area study since January 2018 due to the low standard of air quality in the town centre.

The Welsh Government has commissioned Arup to review the Caerleon Station Grip 3 Report land around the site has been safeguarded by Newport City Council for future reopening but in the near term the station has been neglected in favour of other reopenings predominantly in the Cardiff area.

Nevertheless, Newport City Council has discussed preliminary matters such as the provision of approximately half a hectare for car parking, subject to exact provision being agreed with Welsh Government.

The rail operator Transport for Wales announced in 2018 that Caerleon is a target for reopening as part of the South Wales Metro project. It would join similar proposed facilities at Magor, Cardiff Parkway, and Llanwern.

Proposals to reopen Caerleon station were strengthened following the decision by First Minister Mark Drakeford in 2019 to reject the M4 relief road, which now allows up to £1.4bn to be allocated through the Welsh Government's borrowing facility for improving infrastructure in and around the south east Wales M4.

Services

See also
Railway stations in Newport
South Wales Metro
 Transport for Wales
 Proposed railway stations in Wales

References

Notes

Sources

External links

Station on a navigable 1947 O.S. map

Disused railway stations in Newport, Wales
Railway stations in Great Britain opened in 1874
Railway stations in Great Britain closed in 1962
Former Great Western Railway stations
Caerleon
1874 establishments in Wales